The women's 4×100 metre medley relay event at the 1968 Olympic Games took place on 17 October. This swimming event uses medley swimming as a relay. Because an Olympic size swimming pool is 50 metres long, each of the four swimmers completed two lengths of the pool, each using a different stroke. The first on each team used the backstroke, the second used the breaststroke, the third used the butterfly stroke, and the final swimmer used freestyle (restricted to not allow any of the first three strokes to be used, though nearly all swimmers use front crawl regardless).

The first swimmer must touch the wall before the next can leave the starting block, and so forth; timing of the starts is thus important.

Medalists

Results

Heats
Heat 1

Heat 2

Final

References

Swimming at the 1968 Summer Olympics
1968 in women's swimming
Women's events at the 1968 Summer Olympics